The First Presbyterian Church of Florence, at 225 East Butte Avenue in Florence, Arizona, was built in 1931.  It was designed by Wallingford & Bell in Mission/Spanish Revival style.  It was listed on the National Register of Historic Places in 1994.

In 2012, the congregation had 64 members.

References

Churches on the National Register of Historic Places in Arizona
Mission Revival architecture in Arizona
Churches completed in 1931
Churches in Pinal County, Arizona
National Register of Historic Places in Pinal County, Arizona
Florence, Arizona